William Malcolm Hailey, 1st Baron Hailey,  (15 February 1872 – 1 June 1969) known as Sir Malcolm Hailey between 1921 and 1936, was a British peer and administrator in British India.

Education
Hailey was educated at Merchant Taylors' School and Corpus Christi College, Oxford and entered the Indian Civil Service in 1896.

Hailey College of Commerce is a constituent undergraduate, graduate, and post-graduate college of the University of the Punjab in Lahore, Punjab, Pakistan. Established on 4 March 1927, after the name of Sir Malcolm Hailey, the then Governor of the Punjab and the Chancellor of the university. It is the oldest specialized institution of commerce in Asia.

Career
Hailey was Governor of the Punjab from 1924 to 1928, a compromiser with the Akali leadership, and Governor of the United Provinces 1928 to 1934. He was early convinced of the strength of Indian nationalism, but remained ambivalent about it.

He was appointed a CIE in 1911, a Companion of the Order of the Star of India in 1915, a Knight Commander of the Order of the Indian Empire 1921 and appointed a Knight Grand Commander of the Order of the Indian Empire in 1928 and a Knight Grand Commander of the Order of the Star of India in 1932. In 1936, while he was the Governor of United Provinces, India's oldest national park was created and was named Hailey National Park in his honour (later renamed Jim Corbett National Park). The same year, he was raised to the peerage as Baron Hailey, of Shahpur in the Punjab and Newport Pagnell in the County of Buckingham. In 1937 he was elected President of the Royal Asiatic Society of Great Britain and Ireland. In 1939, he was made a GCMG.

He subsequently spent time on missions to Africa, producing the African Survey in the late 1930s that proved very influential. He advised limited recognition of African national movements.
He was invited to a meeting by the Secretary of State for the Colonies, Malcolm MacDonald, in 1939 at which the setting up of the Colonial Social Science Research Council was discussed. In 1942, he was appointed to lead the British Colonial Research Committee.

In 1949, he was made a member of the Privy Council. His powers of speaking and intellectual synthesis were widely recognised. He became a member of the Order of Merit in 1956.

Hailey also served as a Trustee of The Rhodes Trust from 1941 to 1964.

Personal life

Malcolm Hailey married Andreina Alesandra Balzani in 1896.

Lord Hailey died at Putney on 1 June 1969 and his ashes were taken for burial in the family vault at Simla in India. A memorial plaque to Hailey was unveiled in the west cloister of Westminster Abbey in 1971. With his death, the barony became extinct, as his only son and heir, Alan Hailey (1900–1943) had been killed without issue in the Middle East during the Second World War.

Styles
1872–1911: Malcolm Hailey
1911–1915: Malcolm Hailey, CIE
1915–1921: Malcolm Hailey, CSI, CIE
1921–1928: Sir Malcolm Hailey, KCSI, CIE
1928–1932: Sir Malcolm Hailey, GCIE, KCSI
1932–1936: Sir Malcolm Hailey, GCSI, GCIE
1936–1939: The Right Honourable The Lord Hailey, GCSI, GCIE
1939–1948: The Right Honourable The Lord Hailey, GCSI, GCMG, GCIE
1948–1956: The Right Honourable The Lord Hailey, GCSI, GCMG, GCIE, PC
1956–1969: The Right Honourable The Lord Hailey, OM, GCSI, GCMG, GCIE, PC

Notes

References

1942 speech

 

1872 births
1969 deaths
Members of the Order of Merit
Knights Grand Commander of the Order of the Star of India
Knights Grand Cross of the Order of St Michael and St George
Knights Grand Commander of the Order of the Indian Empire
Indian Civil Service (British India) officers
Barons in the Peerage of the United Kingdom
Peers created by Edward VIII
Governors of Punjab (British India)
People educated at Merchant Taylors' School, Northwood
Alumni of Corpus Christi College, Oxford
Members of the Privy Council of the United Kingdom
Presidents of the Royal Asiatic Society